Nol van Berckel ( – ) was a Dutch footballer and judge.

Football career

International
Van Berckel was part of the Netherlands national football team, playing 6 matches and scoring 2 goals. He played his first match on 16 October 1910 against Germany and his final game was an April 1912 friendly match against Belgium.

Judicial career
Under the more formal name Arnold Louis Maria van Berckel he had a successful career as a judge. After World War II he was the head judge of the court of The Hague. The trial of Anton Mussert in November 1945 was, for example, held under his supervision.

See also
 List of Dutch international footballers

References

External links

1890 births
1973 deaths
Footballers from Amsterdam
Association football forwards
Dutch footballers
20th-century Dutch judges
Netherlands international footballers
Quick 1888 players